Eclipta pusilla is a Caribbean species of plants in the family Asteraceae. It is native to the island of Puerto Rico in the West Indies, part of the United States.

References

External links

Heliantheae
Flora of Puerto Rico
Plants described in 2007
Flora without expected TNC conservation status